Mitromorpha senegalensis is a species of sea snail, a marine gastropod mollusk in the family Mitromorphidae.

Description
The shell can attain an length of 8 mm.

Distribution
This marine species occurs off Senegal.

References

 Rolàn, E. & Boyer, F., 2001. The genus Mitrolumna (Gastropoda, Turridae) in west Africa. Iberus 19(1): 115–128

External links
 Specimen at MNHN, Paris
 
 

senegalensis
Invertebrates of West Africa
Gastropods described in 2001